Blind Channel Water Aerodrome  is located adjacent to Blind Channel, British Columbia, Canada. Blind Channel lies at the eastern end of West Thurlow Island in the Discovery Islands very near Camp Cordero.

References

Seaplane bases in British Columbia
Discovery Islands
Strathcona Regional District
Registered aerodromes in British Columbia